Richard Dyott is the name of:

 Richard Dyott (1591–1660), English lawyer and politician who sat in the House of Commons between 1623 and 1640
 Richard Dyott (1619–1677), English landowner and politician who sat in the House of Commons between 1667 and 1677
 Richard Dyott (1667–1719), English landowner and politician who sat in the House of Commons in three periods between 1690 and 1710
 Richard Dyott (1808–1891), English Conservative politician who sat in the House of Commons from 1865 to 1880